Pearcea schimpfii is a species of plant in the family Gesneriaceae. It is endemic to Ecuador.  Its natural habitat is subtropical or tropical moist montane forests.

References

schimpfii
Endemic flora of Ecuador
Near threatened plants
Taxonomy articles created by Polbot